The DMAX V6 engine is a  Diesel engine.

It was designed, and is produced by Isuzu in Fujisawa, Kanagawa, Japan but the design rights to the engine are now owned by General Motors. It uses high-pressure common rail direct injection with four valve per cylinder, cylinder heads. A variable-geometry turbocharger and intercooler are also used. The engine was used in Europe by GM's Opel subsidiary and by Renault.

The engine's internal name is 6DE1.

Applications:
 Saab 9-5
2001-2005 internal engine's name D308L .
 Opel/Vauxhall Vectra and Signum
2003-2005 internal engine's name Y30DT .
2005-2008 internal engine's name Z30DT .

Renault 

 Renault Vel Satis
2000-2010 internal engine's name P9X 701 .
2005-2010 internal engine's name P9X 715 .
 Renault Espace
2002-2006 internal engine's name P9X 701 .
2006-2010 internal engine's name P9X 715 .

See also
 List of GM engines

V6
Diesel engines by model
V6 engines